Ranga Chivaviro (born 21 November 1992) is a South African soccer player who plays for South African Premier Division side Marumo Gallants, as a forward.

Club career
Born in Limpopo, Chivaviro played for Witbank Spurs, Cape Town All Stars and Ubuntu Cape Town, before signing for South African Premier Division side Baroka in the summer of 2018. After spending part of the 2019–20 season on loan at TS Sporting, he was released by Baroka at the end of the season.

In March 2021, Chivaviro signed for Kosovar side KF Trepça '89. He left the club again at the end of the season. In September 2021, he returned to South Africa and signed with Venda FA. He left the club in June 2022. In August 2022, Chivaviro joined Marumo Gallants.

References

External links
 

Living people
1992 births
South African soccer players
South African expatriate soccer players
Soccer players from Limpopo
Association football forwards
Witbank Spurs F.C. players
Cape Town All Stars players
Ubuntu Cape Town F.C. players
Baroka F.C. players
TS Sporting F.C. players
KF Trepça '89 players
Marumo Gallants F.C. players
South African Premier Division players
National First Division players
Football Superleague of Kosovo players
Expatriate footballers in Kosovo